The Duffie Oak is a historic Southern live oak in Mobile, Alabama.  Being approximately 300 years old, it is considered by scholars to be the oldest living landmark in the city.  It was originally known as the Seven Sisters Oak for its number of large limbs.  It was later renamed for former mayor of Mobile George A. Duffee, who lived nearby.

It was recognized by the National Arborist Association in 1977. The Alabama Forestry Commission recognized it as a famous and historic tree in 2003.

See also
Boyington Oak
List of individual trees

References

Individual oak trees
Tourist attractions in Mobile, Alabama
Individual trees in Alabama